Labour Inspection (Agriculture) Convention, 1969 is  an International Labour Organization Convention.

It was established in 1969, with the preamble stating:
Having decided upon the adoption of certain proposals with regard to labour inspection in agriculture,...

Ratifications
As of January 2023, the convention has been ratified by 56 countries.

References

External links 
Text
Ratifications

International Labour Organization conventions
Treaties concluded in 1969
Treaties entered into force in 1972
Agricultural treaties
Treaties of Albania
Treaties of Argentina
Treaties of Azerbaijan
Treaties of Belgium
Treaties of Bolivia
Treaties of Bosnia and Herzegovina
Treaties of Burkina Faso
Treaties of Colombia
Treaties of Costa Rica
Treaties of Croatia
Treaties of the Czech Republic
Treaties of Ivory Coast
Treaties of Denmark
Treaties of Egypt
Treaties of Estonia
Treaties of El Salvador
Treaties of Fiji
Treaties of Finland
Treaties of France
Treaties of West Germany
Treaties of Guatemala
Treaties of Guyana
Treaties of Hungary
Treaties of Iceland
Treaties of Italy
Treaties of Kazakhstan
Treaties of Kenya
Treaties of Latvia
Treaties of Luxembourg
Treaties of Madagascar
Treaties of Malawi
Treaties of Malta
Treaties of Moldova
Treaties of Montenegro
Treaties of Morocco
Treaties of the Netherlands
Treaties of Norway
Treaties of Poland
Treaties of Portugal
Treaties of the Socialist Republic of Romania
Treaties of Saint Vincent and the Grenadines
Treaties of Serbia and Montenegro
Treaties of Yugoslavia
Treaties of Slovakia
Treaties of Slovenia
Treaties of Francoist Spain
Treaties of Sweden
Treaties of Syria
Treaties of North Macedonia
Treaties of Togo
Treaties of Ukraine
Treaties of Uruguay
Treaties of Zambia
Treaties of Zimbabwe
Treaties extended to Greenland
Treaties extended to the Faroe Islands
Treaties extended to French Guiana
Treaties extended to French Polynesia
Treaties extended to Guadeloupe
Treaties extended to Martinique
Treaties extended to New Caledonia
Treaties extended to Réunion
Treaties extended to Saint Pierre and Miquelon
Treaties extended to Aruba
1969 in labor relations